The 2008 South Sydney Rabbitohs season was the 99th in the club's history. Coached by Jason Taylor and captained by David Kidwell & Roy Asotasi, the team competed in the National Rugby League's 2008 Telstra Premiership, finishing the regular season in 14th place out of 16 teams and so failing to reach the finals. The club also competed in the 2008 Under-20s competition.

On 26 January 2008, the Rabbitohs played the Leeds Rhinos at the Hodges Stadium at University of North Florida in Jacksonville, Florida, the first time first-grade professional rugby league teams from Australia and England played each other in the United States. A crowd of about 12,000 attended with Russell Crowe, Greg Norman, and the stars of television show American Chopper among the audience. Leeds Rhinos won the game 26-24(after having been behind 26-0 at half-time South Sydney staged an unlikely comeback that fell agonisingly short).

South Sydney equalled the second-biggest comeback in premiership history in Round 16 against the North Queensland Cowboys. After trailing 28–4 after fifty minutes, the Rabbitohs won the match 29–28.

No Rabbitohs players were selected for the 2008 State of Origin series, however at the end of season 2008 Rugby League World Cup tournament four were selected to play for Tonga (Manase Manuokafoa, Eddie Paea, Fetuli Talanoa and Joel Taufa'ao); three for the successful New Zealand squad (David Fa'alogo, David Kidwell and Issac Luke) and one captained Samoa (Nigel Vagana).

Ladder

Player statistics

Representative Honours

References

South Sydney Rabbitohs seasons
South Sydney Rabbitohs season